Wayne Gino Odjick (September 7, 1970 – January 15, 2023) was a Canadian professional ice hockey left winger who played 12 seasons in the National Hockey League (NHL) from 1990 to 2002 for the Vancouver Canucks, New York Islanders, Philadelphia Flyers and Montreal Canadiens. Of Algonquin heritage, he was known as an enforcer during his playing career, earning him the nicknames "Algonquin Assassin" and "Maniwaki Mauler".

Early life
Odjick was born in the Algonquin reserve of Kitigan Zibi just outside the town of Maniwaki, Quebec. His father, Joe, was born in 1939 at Rapid Lake to Basil, a trapper and fishing guide, who was later killed in France in 1944 during the Second World War, and Marie-Antoinette Marchand, who was part-French. At the age of nine, Joe was sent to a residential school in Spanish, Ontario. The registration number he was given at the school, 29, was later used by Odjick during his playing career. Odjick was the fourth child and only son of six children for Joe and Giselle, after Debbie, Shelley, Judy and ahead of Janique and Dina; the Odjicks also raised at least 32 foster children. Originally named Wayne, Odjick was soon given a new name, Gino, as the family found out there was another Wayne on the reserve.

Odjick played hockey from an early age, but it was not until he was 11 that he joined an organized team, which would be managed by Joe. He played in the 1983 Quebec International Pee-Wee Hockey Tournament with a minor ice hockey team from Maniwaki. Until he was 15, Odjick stayed with local teams that mainly played other teams from reserves, often coached by his father. At that age, he considered quitting hockey to pursue other activities, but decided to accept a try-out for the Hawkesbury Hawks, a Tier II junior team from Ontario. Though he had been a defensive defenceman until that point, Odjick soon realized that his skills were not good enough, and instead became an enforcer. It was while in Hawkesbury that Odjick was first given the nickname "the Algonquin Assassin," a reference to his heritage and skills as a fighter.

Odjick credited his sense of defending his team and fighting skills in part due to racial tensions between natives of the reserve and nearby townspeople. He later worked to help Indigenous youth.

Playing career
As a youth Odjick played two seasons with the Laval Titan of the Quebec Major Junior Hockey League, playing for the Memorial Cup both seasons. Odjick was drafted by the Vancouver Canucks in the fifth round (86th overall) in the 1990 NHL Entry Draft. He played 17 games for the Canucks' minor league affiliate, the Milwaukee Admirals of the International Hockey League before joining the Canucks full-time in 1990. He quickly became a fan-favourite, with chants of "Gino, Gino" in appreciation of him.

His primary role with the Canucks was as an enforcer. For part of his time in Vancouver, he played on a line with the high-scoring Pavel Bure. For the 1993–94 NHL season, Odjick had a career high of 16 goals and 13 assists for 29 points. He played in a total of 8 seasons for the Canucks from 1990–91 to 1997–98. During six of those seasons, he had over 200 penalty minutes, and twice he had over 300. His sixth season (1997–98) with over 200 penalty minutes was split between the Canucks (181 penalty minutes in 35 games) and New York Islanders (31 in 13 games).

In the 1997–98 season, Odjick was traded to the New York Islanders and played there until 1999 when he was traded to the Philadelphia Flyers. He left Philadelphia during the 2000–01 season for the Montreal Canadiens. His last NHL season was with Montreal in 2001–02. He missed most of the 2002–03 season due to concussion from a puck hitting him in the back of the head during pre-season practice, and was subsequently suspended in February 2003 by the Canadiens for failure to report to the minor-league AHL team in Utah. He retired from professional hockey thereafter, his last known organized hockey stint coming in 2005, when he played on the Horse Lake Thunder team. The Thunder featured several hired ringers, including ex-NHLers Theo Fleury, Sasha Lakovic and Dody Wood, and made it to the semi-finals of the 2005 Allan Cup.

Post-playing career
In 2003, Odjick moved back to Vancouver and collaborated with the Musqueam First Nation to manage the Musqueam Golf & Learning Academy.

Odjick starred in the 2014 Canadian short film Ronny Nomad and the Legendary Napkins of Wood written and produced by Adrian Patterson. The film won best comedic short at the Oregon Independent Film Festival.

On June 26, 2014, Odjick revealed that he was diagnosed with the rare terminal disease AL amyloidosis, a rare blood disorder and whose exact cause is often unknown. This condition had slowly been hardening his heart by coating it in abnormal protein deposits, which eventually led Odjick to suffer a heart attack. He received the Indspire Award in the sports category in 2015. Given just months to live, Odjick turned to an experimental treatment for his illness. Odjick began recovering, and three years later, his heart was working at 60 percent of its capacity.

Odjick died from a heart attack on January 15, 2023, at age 52. Odjick's parents, Joe and Giselle, predeceased him. He had eight children and five sisters. His sister Dina Odjick confirmed his death.

Career statistics

Regular season and playoffs

Source:

See also
 Fighting in ice hockey
 List of NHL players with 2,000 career penalty minutes

References

Bibliography

External links
 

1970 births
2023 deaths
Algonquin people
Anglophone Quebec people
Canadian ice hockey left wingers
First Nations sportspeople
Ice hockey people from Quebec
Indspire Awards
Laval Titan players
Milwaukee Admirals (IHL) players
Montreal Canadiens players
New York Islanders players
People from Outaouais
Philadelphia Flyers players
Quebec Citadelles players
Vancouver Canucks draft picks
Vancouver Canucks players